El final del camino is an adventure television series set in 11th-and 12th-century Iberia, with the construction of the Santiago de Compostela Cathedral as backdrop. It aired in 2017 on La 1 and TVG.

Premise 
The fiction takes place between 1075 and 1120.
It follows the mishaps of the three Catoira brothers, one of which (Pedro) is abducted by Muslims during a raid (aceifa) when he was a child. The other two (Gonzalo and Esteban) seek refuge in Santiago de Compostela where they are raised under the protection of Bishop Diego Peláez at the time of the construction of the Santiago de Compostela Cathedral.

Cast 

 Antonio Velázquez as Gonzalo de Catoira.
 Javier Rey as Pedro de Catoira.
  as Esteban de Catoira.
 Begoña Maestre as Elvira, Gonzalo's wife, working at a pilgrim's hospital.
  as Rodrigo de Limia, "Animal".
 Juan Fernández as Bishop .
 Cristina Castaño as Constance of Burgundy.
 Asier Etxeandia as King Alfonso, the Brave.
  as Urraca.
 Maxi Iglesias as King Alfonso, the Battler.
  as Diego Gelmírez.
  as Tomás.
  as Simón.
 Manuel de Blas as Efraim, a Jewish physician, working at the pilgrim's hospital.
 Antonio Durán, "Morris" as Odamiro, the abbot of the Monastery of Antealtares.
 Juan Díaz as Raymond of Burgundy.
  as the Monk.
  as Yusuf Ibn Tasufin.
  as Nadir.
 Said El Mouden as Al-Mu Tamid.
 Inti El Meskine as Zaida.
  as Jimena.
  as the King's Captain.
  as Gelmiro.
 Déborah Vukusic as Naima.
 Manuel Regueiro as Conde Andrade.
 Héctor Carballo as Nuno.
  as Maestro Bernardo.
 Carlos Villarino as Don García.

Production and release 
El final del camino was produced by RTVE and Voz Audiovisual. The screenplay was authored by Alberto Guntín, Xosé Morais and Víctor Sierra whereas the episodes were directed by Miguel Alcantud, Miguel Conde and Óscar Pedraza. Filming took place in Galicia, both for the Galician settings as well as for those settings in Toledo, Seville and Northern Africa.

It consisted of 8 episodes with a running time of about 70 minutes. The first episode premiered on La 1 in prime time on 11 January 2017. The broadcasting run ended on 1 March 2017 with a 8.4% average audience share.

References 

Television series set in the 11th century
Television series set in the 12th century
2017 Spanish television series debuts
2017 Spanish television series endings
2010s Spanish drama television series
La 1 (Spanish TV channel) network series
Television shows filmed in Spain
Spanish adventure television series
Spanish-language television shows
Television shows set in Galicia (Spain)